The 2004–05 Pacific Tigers men's basketball team represented the University of the Pacific during the 2004–05 NCAA Division I men's basketball season. The Tigers were led by 17th-year head coach Bob Thomason and played their home games at the Alex G. Spanos Center in Stockton, California as members of the Big West Conference. Pacific swept through the Big West regular season schedule to finish a sparkling 18–0 in conference play. The Tigers lost to Utah State in the championship game of the Big West tournament, but did receive an at-large bid to the NCAA tournament. Playing as the No. 8 seed in the Albuquerque region, the team defeated No. 9 seed Pittsburgh in the opening round. Playing in the Round of 32 for the second straight season, the Tigers were beaten by No. 1 seed Washington to end their season at 27–4 (18–0 Big West).

Roster

Schedule and results

|-
!colspan=9 style=| Regular season

|-
!colspan=9 style=| Big West tournament

|-
!colspan=9 style=| NCAA tournament

Source:

Rankings

Awards and honors
Bob Thomason – Hugh Durham Award, Big West Coach of the Year

References

Pacific Tigers men's basketball seasons
Pacific
Pacific
Pacific
Pacific